Branko Ilić (born 6 February 1983) is a Slovenian former professional footballer. Usually a right-back, he also played as a central defender.

In his country, he appeared for Olimpija Ljubljana (two spells), Grosuplje, and Domžale (two stints). He also competed professionally in Spain, Russia, Cyprus, Israel, Serbia, Kazakhstan, Japan and Denmark.

A Slovenian international between 2004 and 2015, Ilić was part of the squad at the 2010 FIFA World Cup.

Club career
Born in Ljubljana, Socialist Republic of Slovenia, Socialist Federal Republic of Yugoslavia, Ilić started his career at local NK Olimpija, where he made his senior debut in 2003 against FC Koper. He joined NK Domžale in January 2005, after his former club went bankrupt.

Ilić was loaned to Real Betis in January 2007, becoming the first Slovenian to play for them. His first official appearance came against city rivals Sevilla FC, in a Copa del Rey quarter-final clash. On 4 February he first appeared in La Liga, providing the assist for Robert's goal in a 2–1 away win at Athletic Bilbao.

After a positive spell, the Andalusian side completed the transfer for €1.5 million in the summer of 2007, but Ilić eventually fell out of rotation in 2008–09 after the signing of S.L. Benfica's Nélson, in a relegation-ending season where he only featured in three matches.

On 6 September 2009, FC Moscow signed Ilić on loan from Betis, for one year. In late January 2010, however, he was released by the latter, immediately joining another Moscow-based team, FC Lokomotiv.

On 13 August 2010, Sky Sports reported that Ilić was on trial in England with Premier League's Blackpool, but nothing came of it. On 5 June 2013, after one season in the Cypriot First Division with Anorthosis Famagusta FC, he and teammate Jürgen Colin signed two-year contracts with Hapoel Tel Aviv F.C. from Israel.

Ilić agreed to a two-year deal with Serbian club FK Partizan on 10 July 2014. The following summer he moved teams and countries again, joining Kazakhstan Premier League champions FC Astana.

On 6 January 2016, Ilić signed for Urawa Red Diamonds from Japan. On 5 February of the following year he returned to his homeland, joining Olimpija Ljubljana.

Ilić signed for Vejle Boldklub in Denmark on 15 January 2019. In July 2020, after a second spell with Domžale, the 36-year-old announced his retirement.

International career
Ilić represented Slovenia at youth level, making his competitive debut for the under-19 team in October 2001 against Greece. He was also capped for the under-21s, playing nine matches in UEFA competitions.

Ilić made his debut for the senior side on 18 August 2004 in a friendly with Serbia and Montenegro. He was included in the squad for the 2010 FIFA World Cup in South Africa, but did not leave the substitutes bench in an eventual group-stage exit.

Overall, Ilić played 63 games for his country, scoring one goal against San Marino in the UEFA Euro 2016 qualifiers (6–0 home victory).

Career statistics

Club

International

Score and result list Slovenia's goal tally first, score column indicates score after Ilić goal.

Honours
Olimpija
Slovenian Football Cup: 2002–03

Domžale
Slovenian PrvaLiga: 2006–07

Partizan
Serbian SuperLiga: 2014–15

Olimpija Ljubljana
Slovenian PrvaLiga: 2017–18
Slovenian Football Cup: 2017–18

See also
Slovenian international players

References

External links

Slovenian League stats 

1983 births
Living people
Slovenian people of Serbian descent
Footballers from Ljubljana
Slovenian footballers
Association football defenders
Slovenian PrvaLiga players
Slovenian Second League players
NK Olimpija Ljubljana (1945–2005) players
NK Domžale players
NK Olimpija Ljubljana (2005) players
La Liga players
Real Betis players
Russian Premier League players
FC Moscow players
FC Lokomotiv Moscow players
Cypriot First Division players
Anorthosis Famagusta F.C. players
Israeli Premier League players
Hapoel Tel Aviv F.C. players
Serbian SuperLiga players
FK Partizan players
Kazakhstan Premier League players
FC Astana players
Urawa Red Diamonds players
Danish Superliga players
Vejle Boldklub players
Slovenia youth international footballers
Slovenia under-21 international footballers
Slovenia international footballers
2010 FIFA World Cup players
Slovenian expatriate footballers
Expatriate footballers in Spain
Expatriate footballers in Russia
Expatriate footballers in Cyprus
Expatriate footballers in Israel
Expatriate footballers in Serbia
Expatriate footballers in Kazakhstan
Expatriate footballers in Japan
Expatriate men's footballers in Denmark
Slovenian expatriate sportspeople in Spain
Slovenian expatriate sportspeople in Russia
Slovenian expatriate sportspeople in Cyprus
Slovenian expatriate sportspeople in Israel
Slovenian expatriate sportspeople in Serbia
Slovenian expatriate sportspeople in Japan
Slovenian expatriate sportspeople in Denmark